A free agent is an athlete who is not under contract to a specific team, or whose contract allows him or her to solicit offers from other teams.

Free agent, Free Agent, or FreeAgent can also refer to:

Music
 Free Agent (album), a 2010 album by rapper Joell Ortiz
 Free Agents, a Bay Area rap group who released an album titled Negotiations

Television
 Free Agents, a 2009 English TV series starring Stephen Mangan
 Free Agents (American TV series), a 2011 American workplace sitcom starring Hank Azaria
 The Challenge: Free Agents, season 25 of the MTV reality game show

Other uses
 Free agency (Major League Baseball), the concept of free agency as implemented in one particular baseball league
 Free Agent (novel), the first Paul Dark novel by Jeremy Duns
 Free agent (business), someone who works independently for oneself, rather than a single employer
 An individual capable of exercising free will
 A version of the Usenet client Forté Agent
 FreeAgent (software), an online accounting system
 Seagate FreeAgent, a line of external hard disks marketed by Seagate Technology

See also 
 Agent (disambiguation)
 Agency (disambiguation)